Football is the most popular sport in Poland. Over 400,000 Poles play football regularly, with millions more playing occasionally. The first professional clubs were founded in the early 1900s, and the Poland national football team played its first international match in 1921.

There are hundreds of professional and amateur football teams in Poland; which are under the auspices of the national 1st league, 2nd level, 3rd level, 4 parallel divisions of 4th level, 20 regional parallel divisions of 5th level and a variety of other lower-level leagues. Additionally, there are the Polish Cup and Polish Supercup competitions.

History 

The history of football in Poland started in the late 19th century with the rising popularity of the new sport. At the time, the Polish state was partitioned. The first decades of Polish football are therefore connected with the history of Football in Austria and the Austrian Football Association, which was founded in 1904.

The first Polish football clubs were Lechia Lwów (1903), Czarni Lwów (1903), Pogoń Lwów (1904), KS Cracovia (1906) and Wisła Kraków (1906). The Polish national federation, called the Polish Football Union (Polski Związek Piłki Nożnej, PZPN), was founded on 20 December 1919, in Kraków when 31 delegates elected Edward Cetnarowski as the first president. The PZPN joined FIFA in 1923 and UEFA in 1955.

In a similar fashion to other European states, football appeared in Poland in the late 19th century. In 1888 Prof. Henryk Jordan, a court physician of the Habsburgs and the pioneer of sports in Poland, opened a sports park in Kraków's Błonia, a large open space surrounding the demolished city walls of that town. The park, along with the Sokół society founded in 1867, became the main centres to promote sports and healthy living in Poland. It was Jordan who began promoting football as a healthy sport in the open air; some sources also credit him with bringing the first football to Poland from his travels to Brunswick in 1890. Other sources mention Dr. Edmund Cenar as the one to bring the first ball and the one to translate The Cambridge Rules and parts of the International Football Association Board regulations to Polish language.

On 14 July 1894 during the Second Sokół Jamboree in Lwów a short football match was played between the Sokół members of Lwów and those from Kraków. It lasted only six minutes and was seen as a curiosity rather than a potentially popular sport. Nevertheless, it was the first recorded football match in Polish history. It was won by the Lwów team after Włodzimierz Chomicki scored the only goal - the first known goal in Polish history.

This match precipitated the popularity of the new sport in Poland. Initially the rules and regulations were very simplified, with the size of the field and the ball varying greatly. Despite being discouraged by many educational societies and the state authorities, the new sport gained extreme popularity among pupils of various gymnasiums in Galicia. The first football teams were formed and in 1903–1904, four Lwów-based gymnasiums formed their own sport clubs: the IV Gymnasium for Boys formed a club later renamed to Pogoń Lwów, while the pupils of the I and II State Schools formed the Sława Lwów club, later renamed to Czarni Lwów. In the same season the Lechia Lwów was also formed. It is uncertain which of the clubs was created first as they were initially poorly organized; however, the Czarni Lwów are usually credited as being the first Polish professional football team. The following year, the popularity of the sport spread to nearby Rzeszów where Resovia Rzeszów was formed, while in the German-held part of Poland, the 1. FC Katowice and Warta Poznań were formed.

On 6 June 1906 a representation of Lwów youth came to Kraków for a repeat match, this time composed of two already organized teams, the Czarni and the team of the IV Gymnasium. Kraków's representation was badly beaten in both meetings (4-0 and 2-0 respectively). The same summer the Buffalo Bill Wild West Show set up camp at Kraków's Błonia, right outside of the traditional playground area and Jordan's garden. On 5 August 1906 the team of the Kraków-based Jan Sobieski Gymnasium played a match against the British and American members of Buffalo Bill's troupe, winning 1–0. The only goal scored by Stanisław Szeligowski was also the first goal scored by a Polish team in an international meeting. The success led to the popularisation of football in Kraków and to creation of the first Kraków-based professional football team, KS Cracovia - initially composed primarily of students of the Jan Sobieski Gymnasium. By the autumn of that year there were already 16 teams in Kraków, including Wisła Kraków (It is said that actually Wisła Kraków was the first professional football team and not Cracovia). In 1911, a Kraków-based Union of Polish Football for Galicia was formed and entered the Austrian Football Association. The union inspired the creation of a number of teams.

After the outbreak of World War I, most of the Galician football players, many of them members of either Strzelec or Sokół, joined Piłsudski's Polish Legions. The unit, fighting alongside the Austro-Hungarian Army, fought mostly in various parts of Russian-held Poland, which led to popularisation of the new sport in other parts of Poland. After Poland regained her independence, on 21 December 1919 the Polish Football Association (PZPN) was formed. Headed by Edward Centrarowski, it united most of the then-existent Polish football clubs. The league could not be formed due to the Polish-Bolshevik War, but in 1922 the PZPN published the rules of football and the following year it joined FIFA. In 1921 the league was resumed and the first champions of Poland were KS Cracovia, followed by Pogoń Lwów in 1922, 1923, 1925 and 1926. As Poland was then a fully independent state, in 1921 the Poland national football team was formed. On 18 December 1921 it played its first international match in Budapest against the Hungarian team and was defeated 1–0. In the third international match in Stockholm on 28 May 1922 Poland defeated Sweden 2–1, scoring its first international victory.

During World War II, football in occupied Poland was subject to significant restrictions (see Football in occupied Poland (1939–1945)) for more.

In 1955 the PZPN became one of the founding members of UEFA.

Women's football 

In 1979, a Polish women's football league, Ekstraliga, was established.

Poland women's national football team, unlike the men's, has never qualified for a major tournament, though the team has come close in qualifying for a major tournament since 2010s.

Corruption in Polish football 
In 2005, Polish authorities began an investigation into widespread corruption within Polish football.

In July 2006, the Polish sports minister criticized the PZPN (Polish Football Association) for failing to take adequate steps to fight corruption, and announced an audit of the organization. In January 2007, PZPN board member Wit Żelazko was arrested by Wrocław police. Shortly thereafter, the entire PZPN board was suspended by the sports ministry. This move displeased FIFA which announced that the principle of autonomy of football associations was of utmost importance. The Polish sports ministry, Prime Minister Jarosław Kaczyński, and most fans felt that the battle against corruption was more important, but when FIFA threatened sanctions, the sports ministry backed down and agreed to re-instate the PZPN board.

In September 2008, the Polish Olympic Committee made a request to the Polish Arbitration Tribunal to suspend the management of the PZPN a second time, stating that the PZPN was guilty of "[violating] its statutes in a continuous and flagrant fashion." This request was granted and Robert Zawłocki was named as temporary administrator. However, FIFA again threatened to suspend Polish teams from international competition.

On 15 April 2009, the total number of arrests reached 200, including referees, observers, coaches, players as well as some high-ranking officials of the PZPN. By the end of April 2009, only 15 referees remained who were allowed to preside over top-flight matches.

World Cup 
Poland national football team have qualified for the finals on eight occasions, the last time in for the 2018 FIFA World Cup.

Table

European Competitions

UEFA Champions League

The following teams have qualified at least to 1/2 finals in old European Champion Clubs' Cup format and, since 1992/93 season, at least group stage in the UEFA Champions League:
 Legia Warsaw
 1970 - 1/2
 1971 - 1/4
 1995-96 - 1/4
 2016-17 - Group Stage
 Widzew Łódź
 1983 - 1/2
 1996-97 - Group Stage

UEFA Europa League

The following teams have qualified for elimination rounds in the UEFA Europa League.
 Amica Wronki
 2004-05 - Group Stage
 Lech Poznań
 2008-09 - 1/16
 2010-11 - 1/16
 2015-16 - Group Stage
 2020-21 - Group Stage
 Legia Warsaw
 2011-12 - 1/16
 2013-14 - Group Stage
 2014-15 - 1/16
 2015-16 - Group Stage
 2016-17 - 1/16 (transferred from UCL)
 2021-22 - Group Stage
 Wisła Kraków
 2002-03 - 1/8
 2006-07 - Group Stage
 2011-12 - 1/16

UEFA Euro
Poland have participated in four UEFA European Championships so far: Euro 2008, Euro 2012, Euro 2016 and Euro 2020.

On 18 April 2007 the President of UEFA, Michel Platini, announced that the hosts of the 2012 UEFA European Football Championship would be Poland and Ukraine. Both countries automatically qualified for the event.

Table

Largest football stadiums in Poland

See also
 Football hooliganism in Poland
 Sports in Poland
 Poland national football team
 Ekstraklasa
 Młoda Ekstraklasa
 Polish Championship in Football
 List of derbies in Poland
 List of football stadiums in Poland
 Polish Cup
 Polish SuperCup
 Polish Cup (women)
 Polish women's national football team
 The first game 18 December 1921. Hungary - Poland 1-0
 Polish Squad in Football World Cup France 1938
 The last game: 27 August 1939. Poland - Hungary 4-2
 Polish football in interwar period
 Football Junior Championships of Poland
 Polish Football League 1927-1939
 Sunday of Miracles

Notes

References

External links
 Official website
 Polish Ekstraklasa news in English 
 PSN Futbol – Live Ekstraklasa league table and Polish football news 
 90minut.pl - RSSSF Poland
 Euro in Poland 2012 News, Comments, Photos  
 Pilka.pl - Polish football news center
 Football scores for Polish Football Leagues
  It's a Funny Old Game: Explaining Curiosities from Poland's Football Culture